Terrence Frederick (born February 10, 1990) is a former Gridiron football cornerback. He was selected in the seventh round, 246th overall, by the Pittsburgh Steelers in the 2012 NFL Draft. He played college football at Texas A&M.

References

External links 
 Texas A&M Aggies bio

1990 births
Living people
American football cornerbacks
Canadian football defensive backs
American players of Canadian football
Cleveland Browns players
New Orleans Saints players
New York Giants players
Pittsburgh Steelers players
Winnipeg Blue Bombers players
Sportspeople from Harris County, Texas
Texas A&M Aggies football players
People from Katy, Texas
Players of American football from Texas